In mathematics, the method of clearing denominators, also called clearing fractions, is a technique for simplifying an equation equating two expressions that each are a sum of rational expressions – which includes simple fractions.

Example 

Consider the equation

 

The smallest common multiple of the two denominators 6 and 15z is 30z, so one multiplies both sides by 30z:

 

The result is an equation with no fractions.

The simplified equation is not entirely equivalent to the original.

Description 
Without loss of generality, we may assume that the right-hand side of the equation is 0, since an equation  may equivalently be rewritten in the form .

So let the equation have the form

Then

 

provided that  does not assume the value 0 – in which case also  equals 0.

So we have now

 

Provided that  does not assume the value 0, the latter equation is equivalent with

 

in which the denominators have vanished.

As shown by the provisos, care has to be taken not to introduce zeros of  – viewed as a function of the unknowns of the equation – as spurious solutions.

Example 2

Consider the equation

Following the method as described above results in

Simplifying this further gives us the solution .

References
 

Elementary algebra
Equations